Brochocinek may refer to the following places in Poland:
Brochocinek, Lower Silesian Voivodeship (south-west Poland)
Brochocinek, Masovian Voivodeship (east-central Poland)